Todd County is a county in the central part of the U.S. state of Minnesota. As of the 2020 census, the population was 25,262. Its county seat is Long Prairie.

History
The county was created by the Minnesota Territorial legislature on February 20, 1855, although the county government was not organized until January 1, 1867, with Long Prairie as the county seat. It was named for John Blair Smith Todd, who was a delegate from Dakota Territory to the United States House of Representatives, and general in the Union Army during the American Civil War.

Geography
The Crow Wing River flows southeastward along the northeastern border of Todd County. The Long Prairie River flows east-northeast through the central part of the county, discharging into the Crow Wing on the county's northeastern border.  The Wing River, northwest of the Long Prairie River, also flows into the Crow Wing. The county terrain consists of rolling hills, dotted with lakes and etched with drainages. The area is devoted to agriculture. The terrain slopes to the east and south, with its highest point on the west border at 1,483' (452m) ASL. The county has a total area of 980 sq mi (2538 km2), of which 945 sq mi (2448 km2) is land and 35 sq mi (90.7 km2)(3.5%) is water.

Major highways

  Interstate 94
  U.S. Highway 10
  U.S. Highway 52
  U.S. Highway 71
  Minnesota State Highway 27
  Minnesota State Highway 28
  Minnesota State Highway 210
  Minnesota State Highway 287

Adjacent counties

 Wadena County (north)
 Cass County (northeast)
 Morrison County (east)
 Stearns County (south)
 Douglas County (west)
 Otter Tail County (northwest)

Lakes

 Bass Lake
 Beauty Lake
 Big Birch Lake (part)
 Big Lake
 Big Swan Lake
 Buckhorn Lake
 Bunker Lake
 Cedar Lake
 Charlotte Lake
 Coal Lake
 Fairly Lake
 Fawn Lake
 Felix Lake
 Goose Lake
 Guernsey Lake
 Hayden Lake
 Juergens Lake
 Keller Lake
 Lady Lake
 Lake Osakis (part)
 Latimer Lake
 Lawrence Lake
 Little Birch Lake (part)
 Little Sauk Lake
 Long Lake (Birchdale Twp.)
 Long Lake (Burnhamville Twp.)
 Maple Lake
 Mary Lake (part)
 McCarrahan Lake
 Mill Lake
 Mud Lake
 Pauley Lake
 Pendergast Lake
 Pine Island Lake
 Rice Lake
 Sauk Lake (part)
 Schreiers Lake
 Sheet Lake
 Trace Lake
 Twin Lakes (part)
 West Union Lake

Protected areas

 Aurzada Wildlife Management Area
 Buckhorn Lake State Wildlife Management Area
 Burleene State Wildlife Management Area
 Dower State Wildlife Management Area
 Elgin Woods Wildlife Management Area
 Iona Wildlife Management Area
 Ireland State Wildlife Management Area
 Long Prairie River Wildlife Management Area
 Oak Ridge State Wildlife Management Area
 Ojakis Wildlife Management Area (part)
 Owen-Hinz Wildlife Management Area
 Quistorff Wildlife Management Area
 Randall State Wildlife Management Area
 Santer Wildlife Management Area
 Sheet Lake Wildlife Management Area
 West Union Wildlife Management Area

Demographics

2000 census
As of the 2000 census, there were 24,426 people, 9,342 households, and 6,511 families in Todd County. The population density was 25.8/sqmi (9.98/km2). There were 11,900 housing units at an average density of 12.6/sqmi (4.86/km2). The racial makeup of the county was 97.54% White, 0.11% Black or African American, 0.48% Native American, 0.31% Asian, 0.01% Pacific Islander, 0.72% from other races, and 0.82% from two or more races. 1.90% of the population were Hispanic or Latino of any race. 52.1% were of German, 11.3% Norwegian and 5.6% Polish ancestry.

There were 9,342 households, out of which 31.80% had children under the age of 18 living with them, 59.80% were married couples living together, 6.10% had a female householder with no husband present, and 30.30% were non-families. 26.30% of all households were made up of individuals, and 13.00% had someone living alone who was 65 years of age or older. The average household size was 2.58 and the average family size was 3.14.

The county population contained 27.40% under the age of 18, 8.10% from 18 to 24, 24.70% from 25 to 44, 23.80% from 45 to 64, and 16.10% who were 65 years of age or older. The median age was 38 years. For every 100 females there were 101.80 males. For every 100 females age 18 and over, there were 102.00 males.

The median income for a household in the county was $32,281, and the median income for a family was $39,920. Males had a median income of $28,630 versus $20,287 for females. The per capita income for the county was $15,658. About 9.60% of families and 12.90% of the population were below the poverty line, including 14.60% of those under age 18 and 13.50% of those age 65 or over.

2020 Census

Amish
Todd County has a large concentration of Amish, about the same population size as the Amish settlement at Harmony. It is home to five different Amish communities, with altogether seven church districts in 2013, which indicates a total population of about 1000 people.

Communities

Cities

 Bertha
 Browerville
 Burtrum
 Clarissa
 Eagle Bend
 Grey Eagle
 Hewitt
 Long Prairie (county seat)
 Osakis (partly in Douglas County)
 Staples (partly in Wadena County)
 West Union

Unincorporated communities
 Philbrook
 Pillsbury
 Ward Springs

Townships

 Bartlett
 Bertha
 Birchdale
 Bruce
 Burleene
 Burnhamville
 Eagle Valley
 Fawn Lake
 Germania
 Gordon
 Grey Eagle
 Hartford
 Iona
 Kandota
 Leslie
 Little Elk
 Little Sauk
 Long Prairie
 Moran
 Reynolds
 Round Prairie
 Staples
 Stowe Prairie
 Turtle Creek
 Villard
 Ward
 West Union
 Wykeham

Government and Politics
Todd County voters tend to vote Republican. In 71% of national elections since 1960, the county selected the Republican Party candidate (as of 2020).

See also
 Dromedary Hills
 National Register of Historic Places listings in Todd County, Minnesota

References

External links
 Todd County government’s website 

 
Minnesota counties
1867 establishments in Minnesota
Populated places established in 1867